Fk Javor Matis is a professional football club based in Ivanjica, Serbia. They compete in the Serbian SuperLiga, the top tier of the national league system.

History
In 1912, a student named Milan Radojević brought the first football ball to Ivanjica, which led to the formation of the club. The team mostly played friendly matches before the conclusion of World War II due to a lack of organized football competitions. Between 1958 and 1962, they were close to achieving promotion to the Yugoslav Second League. However, the club never reached higher than the third level until the 1990s.

In 1994, led by manager Slavenko Kuzeljević, the club earned promotion to the Second League of FR Yugoslavia after eliminating Zvezdara and Topličanin in the playoffs. They spent the next eight years in the second tier, having their best season in 1997–98, when they placed fourth in Group West.

In 2002, the club won the Second League (Group West) and took promotion to the First League of FR Yugoslavia for the first time in history. They remained for just one season in the elite division, finishing bottom of the table. During this time, the club became recognizable for featuring a number of young African footballers, mainly from Nigeria and Zimbabwe. They earned another promotion to the top flight in 2005, but again suffered relegation in the same season.

After underperforming in the 2006–07 Serbian First League, the second tier of the restructured national league system, the club managed to convincingly win first place in the 2007–08 season. Moreover, manager Radovan Ćurčić led his team to an unbeaten record and promotion to the Serbian SuperLiga. They subsequently placed fourth in the top flight, their highest league position to date. In 2012, the club celebrated its 100th anniversary.

After a total of six consecutive seasons in the SuperLiga, the club suffered relegation in 2014. However, they won promotion back in the next season. The club subsequently made its greatest success by reaching the final of the 2015–16 Serbian Cup, losing 2–0 to Partizan at the Stadion Metalac.

Honours
Second League of FR Yugoslavia / Serbian First League (Tier 2)
 2001–02 (Group West) / 2007–08

Seasons

Players

First-team squad

Out on loan

Notable players
This is a list of players who have played at full international level.

  Alexander Christovão
  Nemanja Supić
  Ibrahim Walidjo
  Derek Cornelius
  Aleksandar Šofranac
  Filip Ivanovski
  Marko Jevremović
  Damir Kahriman
  Nemanja Miletić
  Milovan Milović
  Miljan Mutavdžić
  Miroslav Vulićević
  Mihajlo Pjanović
  Husniddin Gafurov
  Srboljub Krivokuća
  Blessing Makunike
  Mike Temwanjera
  Leonard Tsipa

For a list of all FK Javor Ivanjica players with a Wikipedia article, see :Category:FK Javor Ivanjica players.

Managerial history

References

External links

 
 Club page at Srbijasport

 
1912 establishments in Serbia
Association football clubs established in 1912
Football clubs in Serbia
Ivanjica